Talbot Glacier is a glacier flowing into Etienne Fjord, Flandres Bay, on the west coast of Graham Land. First charted by the Belgian Antarctic Expedition under Gerlache, 1897–99. Named by the United Kingdom Antarctic Place-Names Committee (UK-APC) in 1960 for William H.F. Talbot (1800–77), English inventor of the first practical photographic process on paper, perfected and called calotype in 1839–41.

Further reading 
 Jane G. Ferrigno, Alison J. Cook, Amy M. Mathie, Richard S. Williams, Jr., Charles Swithinbank, Kevin M. Foley, Adrian J. Fox, Janet W. Thomson, and Jörn Sievers, Coastal-Change and Glaciological Map of the Larsen Ice Shelf Area, Antarctica: 1940–2005, USGS

External links 

 Talbot Glacier on USGS website
 Talbot Glacier on AADC website
 Talbot Glacier on SCAR website
 Talbot Glacier on marineregions.org
 Talbot Glacier distance calculator

References 

Glaciers of Graham Coast
Glaciers of Danco Coast